The Mount Vernon micropolitan area may refer to:

The Mount Vernon, Ohio micropolitan area, United States
The Mount Vernon, Illinois micropolitan area, United States

See also
Mount Vernon metropolitan area (disambiguation)
Mount Vernon (disambiguation)